Olufela Oladele A. Olomola (born 5 September 1997) is an English professional footballer who plays as a winger or as a forward for  side Wealdstone. Known to teammates as "Fela", Olomola holds both British and Nigerian citizenship.

Club career

Southampton
Born in London, England to Nigerian parents, Olomola is a former Arsenal youth graduate. He scored five goals in 26 appearances for the Southampton under-18s during the 2014–15 campaign. The following season, Olomola was appointed captain of the under-18s side ahead of the 2015–16 season. He was promoted to the Southampton under-21 squad later that season. Olomola was named as an unused substitute by first-team boss Ronald Koeman in Saints' 1–1 home draw against Sunderland on 5 March 2016. He made a fine start to the 2016–17 campaign, scoring a brace in Southampton's 4–1 away drubbing of Liverpool at Prenton Park in the first match of the U23 Premier League 2 (Division 2) Championship.

Olomola made his professional debut for Southampton on 26 October 2016, coming on in the 26th minute for Jay Rodriguez in a 1–0 EFL Cup win over Sunderland.

Loan to Yeovil
On 9 July 2017, Olomola joined League Two club Yeovil Town on loan until January 2018.

Return to Southampton
Olomola then returned from loan to help the Saints U23s reach the Southampton FA Senior Cup final.

Scunthorpe United
On 21 May 2018, following his release by Southampton, Olomola signed for League One side Scunthorpe United on a three-year contract.

On 31 August 2018, Olomola returned to Yeovil Town on loan until January 2019.

On 29 July 2019, Olomola joined Carlisle United on a season-long loan deal until the end of the 2019–20 campaign.

He scored his first goal for Scunthorpe on 10 November 2020 in an EFL Trophy group game against Mansfield Town.

He was one of 17 players released by Scunthorpe at the end of the 2020–21 season.

Hartlepool United
On 21 July 2021, Olomola signed for Hartlepool United following a successful trial. He made his Hartlepool debut in a 1–0 victory against Crawley Town.

On 11 February 2022, Olomola returned to National League side Yeovil Town for a third loan spell, until the end of the 2021–22 season. Due to a high number of injuries in the Hartlepool team, Olomola was recalled by Pools on 21 April 2022. At the end of the 2021–22 season, Olomola was released by Hartlepool.

Wealdstone
On 20 July 2022, Olomola joined National League side Wealdstone, following his departure from Hartlepool. Olomola made an immediate impact for Wealdstone scoring on his debut after 16 minutes in a 3-2 victory against Bromley on 6 August 2022.

Career statistics

References

External links
 
 

1997 births
Living people
Footballers from Greater London
Association football forwards
Southampton F.C. players
Yeovil Town F.C. players
Scunthorpe United F.C. players
Carlisle United F.C. players
Hartlepool United F.C. players
Wealdstone F.C. players
English Football League players
National League (English football) players
Black British sportspeople
English sportspeople of Nigerian descent
English footballers